Parakibara is a monotypic genus of flowering plants belonging to the family Monimiaceae. The only species is Parakibara clavigera.

Its native range is Eastern Malesia.

References

Monimiaceae
Monimiaceae genera
Monotypic Laurales genera
Flora of Malesia